JDS Isoshio (SS-568) was the third boat of thes. She was commissioned on 25 November 1972.

Construction and career
Isoshio was laid down at Kawasaki Heavy Industries Kobe Shipyard on 9 July 1970 and launched on 18 March 1972. She was commissioned on 25 November 1972, into the 1st Submarine Group.

On 28 September 1973, she was transferred to the 5th Submarine, which was newly commissioned under the 1st Submarine Group, along with JDS Narushio, who was commissioned on the same day.

Participated in Hawaii dispatch training from October 9 to December 22, 1975 .

On March 24, 1989, she was reclassified as the first training and experimental submarine of the Maritime Self-Defense Force, the ship registration number was changed to ATSS-8001, and it became a ship under the direct control of the 1st submarine group. After the type change, she was slightly modified and used for education and training and experiments on various equipment.

She was decommissioned on 25 March 1992.

In early August 1994, she was used as a target for the new anti-submarine torpedo G-RX4 under development by the Technical Research and Development Institute off the coast of Izu Ōshima. In addition, in order to carry out the test in a submerged state, which is the first attempt by the Maritime Self-Defense Force, a remodeling work was carried out to install a float structure on the hull.

Citations

1972 ships
Uzushio-class submarines
Ships built by Kawasaki Heavy Industries